Charles Johnson (January 17, 1952 – August 13, 2021) was a professional American football player who played nine seasons in the National Football League. He played in Super Bowl XV for the Philadelphia Eagles and was selected to three Pro Bowls. Johnson's three interceptions in 1980 were remarkable because he was typically replaced by teammate Ken Clarke on passing downs. After serving with the U.S. Army in Vietnam, Johnson played college football at the University of Colorado.

After three consecutive Pro Bowl seasons, in the 1982 Philadelphia Eagles training camp Johnson publicly criticized coach Dick Vermeil's training methods and asked to be traded. Both the Cleveland Browns and Minnesota Vikings showed interest, and Johnson chose to go to Minnesota, who sent a 1983 second-round selection to the Eagles in exchange for Johnson.  Johnson would play three more seasons with the Vikings, and retired after the 1984 season.

Johnson died in Angleton, Texas on August 13, 2021, at the age of 69.

References

1952 births
2021 deaths
American football defensive tackles
Tyler Apaches football players
Colorado Buffaloes football players
Philadelphia Eagles players
Minnesota Vikings players
National Conference Pro Bowl players
People from West Columbia, Texas